Stephen Davis (born 18 July 1950) is a British screenwriter and playwright who wrote the film Ruby (based on his stageplay Love Field), and episodes of the TV series Waking the Dead, Silent Witness and Casualty 1909.

He was educated at Manchester Grammar School and Trinity College, Cambridge. He lives near Stroud, Gloucestershire.

He is married to Jane Davis. They have two daughters, Zoe and Natalie.

Filmography

References

External links
 
 Stephen Davis' website has complete list of credits

1950 births
Alumni of Trinity College, Cambridge
Place of birth missing (living people)
Living people
English television writers
Blinky Bill